The Kola is a river on the Kola Peninsula in Murmansk Oblast, Russia. The river flows out of Lake Kolozero north into the Kola Bay of the Barents Sea, some 10 km south of Murmansk. The neighbouring river Tuloma has its mouth just one kilometer to the west. The average discharge is 40 m3/s, but there are large seasonal variations. Its largest tributaries is Kitza and Orlovka from the right, and Tukhta and Medvezhya from the left. The only town on the river is also called Kola.

References

Rivers of Murmansk Oblast
Drainage basins of the Barents Sea